There are several convention centres in Canada. Traditionally there is a distinction in the Canada between convention centres for meetings and those for exhibitions/trade shows. Over the past decades this distinction has become blurred, as exhibition facilities have added meeting rooms and meeting centred venues have opened exhibition halls. Also, most of the bigger hotels have built meeting rooms, some of them for large scale (international) gatherings.

The following list is sorted by province:

Alberta 
 BMO Centre – 282,000 sq ft convention space (Calgary)
 Edmonton Expo Centre – over 500,000 sq ft convention space (Edmonton)
 Government House (Edmonton)
 Edmonton Convention Centre – 150,000 sq ft convention space (Edmonton)
 Telus Convention Centre – 189,000 sq ft convention space (Calgary)

British Columbia 
 BC Place (Vancouver)
 Fraser Valley Trade and Exhibition Centre (Abbotsford)
 Penticton Trade and Convention Centre (Penticton)
 Vancouver Convention Centre (Vancouver)
 Victoria Conference Centre (Victoria)

Manitoba 
 RBC Convention Centre Winnipeg

Newfoundland and Labrador 
 St. John's Convention Centre (St. John's)

Nova Scotia 
 Alderney Landing (Downtown Dartmouth)
 Halifax Convention Centre (Halifax)
 Halifax Exhibition Centre
 World Trade and Convention Centre (Halifax) (closed)

Ontario 
 Exhibition Place (Toronto)
 Beanfield Centre
 Enercare Centre
 EY Centre (Ottawa)
 Government Conference Centre (Ottawa)
 Hamilton Convention Centre (Hamilton)
 International Centre (Mississauga)
 The Kingbridge Centre (King City)
 Metro Toronto Convention Centre (Toronto)
 Rogers Centre
 Muskoka Bible Centre (Huntsville)
 Ottawa Convention Centre (Ottawa)
 Niagara Falls Convention Centre (Niagara Falls)
 Toronto Congress Centre (Toronto)
 London Convention Centre (London, ON)

Quebec 
 Olympic Stadium (Montreal)
 Palais des congrès de Gatineau (Gatineau)
 Palais des congrès de Montréal (Montreal)
 Place Bonaventure (Montreal)
 Hotel Mortagne (Montreal)

Saskatchewan 
 TCU Place (Saskatoon)

See  also 
 Annual events in Canada
 List of convention and exhibition centres
 List of convention centers named after people

 
Convention